Yurkovka is a rural locality (a selo) and the administrative center of Yurkovsky Selsoviet, Tarumovsky District, Republic of Dagestan, Russia. The population was 1,527 as of 2010. There are 13 streets.

Geography 
Yurkovka is located 21 km northeast of Tarumovka (the district's administrative centre) by road. Zelyony Bugor is the nearest rural locality.

References 

Rural localities in Tarumovsky District